MYCIN was an early backward chaining expert system that used artificial intelligence to identify bacteria causing severe infections, such as bacteremia and meningitis, and to recommend antibiotics, with the dosage adjusted for patient's body weight — the name derived from the antibiotics themselves, as many antibiotics have the suffix "-mycin". The Mycin system was also used for the diagnosis of blood clotting diseases.
MYCIN was developed over five or six years in the early 1970s at Stanford University. It was written in Lisp as the doctoral dissertation of Edward Shortliffe under the direction of Bruce G. Buchanan, Stanley N. Cohen and others.

Method
MYCIN operated using a fairly simple inference engine and a knowledge base of ~600 rules. It would query the physician running the program via a long series of simple yes/no or textual questions. At the end, it provided a list of possible culprit bacteria ranked from high to low based on the probability of each diagnosis, its confidence in each diagnosis' probability, the reasoning behind each diagnosis (that is, MYCIN would also list the questions and rules which led it to rank a diagnosis a particular way), and its recommended course of drug treatment.

MYCIN sparked debate about the use of its ad hoc, but principled, uncertainty framework known as "certainty factors". The developers performed studies showing that MYCIN's performance was minimally affected by perturbations in the uncertainty metrics associated with individual rules, suggesting that the power in the system was related more to its knowledge representation and reasoning scheme than to the details of its numerical uncertainty model. Some observers felt that it should have been possible to use classical Bayesian statistics. MYCIN's developers argued that this would require either unrealistic assumptions of probabilistic independence, or require the experts to provide estimates for an unfeasibly large number of conditional probabilities.

Subsequent studies later showed that the certainty factor model could indeed be interpreted in a probabilistic sense, and highlighted problems with the implied assumptions of such a model. However the modular structure of the system would prove very successful, leading to the development of graphical models such as Bayesian networks.

Evidence combination 
In MYCIN it was possible that two or more rules might draw conclusions about a parameter with different weights of evidence. For example, one rule may conclude that the organism in question is E. Coli with a certainty of 0.8 whilst another concludes that it is E. Coli with a certainty of 0.5 or even -0.8. In the event the certainty is less than zero the evidence is actually against the hypothesis. In order to calculate the certainty factor MYCIN combined these weights using the formula below to yield a single certainty factor:

Where X and Y are the certainty factors. This formula can be applied more than once if more than two rules draw conclusions about the same parameter. It is commutative, so it does not matter in which order the weights were combined.

Results
Research conducted at the Stanford Medical School found MYCIN received an acceptability rating of 65% on treatment plan from a panel of eight independent specialists, which was comparable to the 42.5% to 62.5% rating of five faculty members. This study is often cited as showing the potential for disagreement about therapeutic decisions, even among experts, when there is no "gold standard" for correct treatment.

Practical use

MYCIN was never actually used in practice. This wasn't because of any weakness in its performance. Some observers raised ethical and legal issues related to the use of computers in medicine, regarding the responsibility of the physicians in case the system gave wrong diagnosis.  However, the greatest problem, and the reason that MYCIN was not used in routine practice, was the state of technologies for system integration, especially at the time it was developed. MYCIN was a stand-alone system that required a user to enter all relevant information about a patient by typing in responses to questions MYCIN posed. The program ran on a large time-shared system, available over the early Internet (ARPANet), before personal computers were developed. 

MYCIN's greatest influence was accordingly its demonstration of the power of its representation and reasoning approach. Rule-based systems in many non-medical domains were developed in the years that followed MYCIN's introduction of the approach. In the 1980s, expert system "shells" were introduced (including one based on MYCIN, known as E-MYCIN (followed by Knowledge Engineering Environment - KEE)) and supported the development of expert systems in a wide variety of application areas.
A difficulty that rose to prominence during the development of MYCIN and subsequent complex expert systems has been the extraction of the necessary knowledge for the inference engine to use from the human expert in the relevant fields into the rule base (the so-called "knowledge acquisition bottleneck").

See also
 CADUCEUS (expert system)
 Internist-I
 Clinical decision support system
 XCON

References

 The AI Business: The commercial uses of artificial intelligence, ed. Patrick Winston and Karen A. Prendergast. .

External links
 Rule-Based Expert Systems: The MYCIN Experiments of the Stanford Heuristic Programming Project -(edited by Bruce G. Buchanan and Edward H. Shortlife; ebook version)
 TMYCIN, system based on MYCIN
 "Mycin Expert System: A Ruby Implementation" (at the Web Archive).
 "MYCIN: A Quick Case Study"
 " SOME EXPERT SYSTEM NEED COMMON SENSE" -(by John McCarthy)
 "Expert Systems"

Medical expert systems
Expert systems
Medical software
History of artificial intelligence
Diagnostic robots